Eidai Soccer Club was a Japanese football club based in Yamaguchi Prefecture. The club has played in Japan Soccer League (Japanese former top division).

History
The club was formed following the collapse of the original Nagoya Mutual Bank club. In 1973 they were promoted to the JSL Division 2 and the following year to Division 1. In their first season in the top flight they made the final of the Emperor's Cup, only to lose 2–1 to Yanmar Diesel.

In 1976 they had another opportunity at cup glory when they made the final of the Japan Soccer League Cup, but they lost again, 2–1 to Mitsubishi Motors. With increasing costs of running a top-flight team out of Yamaguchi Prefecture, at the time midway between Toyo Industries and Nippon Steel, Eidai Industries decided to close their team in March 1977, and thus Fujitsu, who had won Division 2 but lost the promotion/relegation series, was promoted anyway.

Record

Club name
1972–1975 : Eidai Industries SC
1976 : Eidai SC

External links
Football of Japan

Japan Soccer League clubs
1972 establishments in Japan
1977 disestablishments in Japan
Association football clubs established in 1972
Defunct football clubs in Japan
Association football clubs disestablished in 1977
Sports teams in Yamaguchi Prefecture
Works association football clubs in Japan